Akoto is an Ashanti surname. Notable people with the surname include:

Osei Yaw Akoto ( 1800–1834), Asantehene 
Owusu Afriyie Akoto (born 1949), Ghanaian agricultural economist and politician
Ralf Akoto (born 1974), German judoka 

Surnames of Ashanti origin
Surnames of Akan origin